Kondratyevka , rural localities in Russia, may refer to:

 Kondratyevka, Kursk Oblast, a village
 Kondratyevka, Khabarovsk Krai, a selo

 See also
 Kondratyev